Mulock Glacier in Antarctica is a heavily crevassed glacier which flows into the Ross Ice Shelf  south of the Skelton Glacier in the Ross Dependency, Antarctica.

It was named by the New Zealand Antarctic Place-Names Committee in association with Mulock Inlet for Lieutenant George Mulock, Royal Navy, surveyor with the expedition.

Further reading 
  Swithinbank, C. (1964), To the Valley Glaciers That Feed the Ross Ice Shelf, The Geographical Journal, 130(1), 32–48. doi:10.2307/1794263
 S. BANNISTER, B.L.N. KENNETT, Seismic Activity in the Transantarctic Mountains - Results from a Broadband Array Deployment, Terra Antartica 2002, 9(1),41-46
 IMMEDIATE REPORT OF VICTORIA UNIVERSITY OF WELLINGTON ANTARCTIC EXPEDITION 1989-90: VUWAE 34
 MARK W. SEEFELDT AND JOHN J. CASSANO, THOMAS R. PARISH, Dominant Regimes of the Ross Ice Shelf Surface Wind Field during Austral Autumn 2005, NOVEMBER 2007, PP 1933 - 1955
 Richard Levy, David Harwood, Fabio Florindo, Francesca Sangiorgi, Robert Tripati, Hilmar von Eynatten,  Edward Gasson, Gerhard Kuhn, Aradhna Tripati, Robert DeConto, Christopher Fielding, Brad Field, Nicholas Golledge, Robert McKay, Timothy Naish, Matthew Olney, David Pollard, Stefan Schouten, Franco Talarico, Sophie Warny, Veronica Willmott, Gary Acton, Kurt Panter, Timothy Paulsen, Marco Taviani, and SMS Science Team, Antarctic ice sheet sensitivity to atmospheric CO2 variations in the early to mid-Miocene, PNAS first published February 22, 2016 https://doi.org/10.1073/pnas.1516030113

References 

Glaciers of Hillary Coast